Rineloricaria melini is a species of catfish in the family Loricariidae. It is native to South America, where it occurs in the Amazon River basin in Brazil. The species reaches 13 cm (5.1 inches) in standard length and is believed to be a facultative air-breather.

Rineloricaria melini appears in the aquarium trade, where it is typically referred to as the dappled whiptail catfish.

References 

Fish described in 1959
Catfish of South America
Freshwater fish of Brazil
Fish of the Amazon basin
Loricariini